Ranunculus dissectifolius is a rare species of buttercup found in alpine Australia.

References

dissectifolius
Flora of New South Wales